Agata Ewa Korc (born 27 March 1986) is a Polish swimmer. She competed at the 2008 Summer Olympics in the 50 m and 100 m freestyle events, but did not reach the finals.

References

1986 births
Living people
People from Zgorzelec
Swimmers at the 2008 Summer Olympics
Polish female freestyle swimmers
Olympic swimmers of Poland
Sportspeople from Lower Silesian Voivodeship
21st-century Polish women